Lomandra spicata is a rainforest plant found in eastern Australia.

References

spicata
Asparagales of Australia
Flora of Queensland
Flora of New South Wales